Lianhua station may refer to:
Lianhua station (Chengdu Metro), a metro station on Line 8 (Chengdu Metro)
Lianhua station (Chongqing Rail Transit), a metro station on Line 3 (Chongqing Rail Transit)
Lianhua station (Fuzhou Metro), a metro station on Line 6 (Fuzhou Metro), currently a unopened station on the operational Phase 1 of Line 6
Lianhua station (Guangzhou Metro), a metro station under planning on Line 8 (Guangzhou Metro)